Licona is a surname. Notable people with the surname include:

Alejandro Licona (born 1953), Mexican dramatist
Carlos Licona (born 1995), Mexican American professional boxer
Gonzalo Hernández Licona, Mexican economist
Michael R. Licona (born 1961), American New Testament scholar, Christian apologist and historian